The Soviet passport was an identity document issued pursuant to the laws of the Union of Soviet Socialist Republics (USSR) for citizens of the USSR. For the general purposes of identity certification, Soviet passports contained such data as name, date of birth, gender, place of birth, ethnicity, and citizenship, as well as a photo of the passport holder. At different stages of development of the Soviet passport system, they could also contain information on place of work, social status (marriage, children), and other supporting information needed for those agencies and organizations to which the Soviet citizens used to appeal.

History 

The passport system of the Soviet Union underwent a number of transformations in the course of its history. In the late Soviet Union citizens of age sixteen or older had to have an internal passport. In addition, a passport for travel abroad (often confusingly translated as "foreign passport") was required for travel abroad. There were several types of abroad passport: an ordinary one, known simply as "USSR zagranpasport", a civil service passport, a diplomatic passport, and a sailor's passport.

Internal passports were serviced by "passport offices" of local offices of the MVDs of Soviet republics. Abroad passports were handled by the Ministry of Foreign Affairs of the corresponding Soviet republic.

Internal passports were used in the Soviet Union for identification of persons for various purposes. In particular, passports were used to control and monitor the place of residence by means of propiska. Officially, propiska was introduced for statistical reasons: since in the planned economy of the Soviet Union the distribution of goods and services was centralized, the overall distribution of population was to be monitored. For example, a valid propiska was necessary to receive higher education or be employed.

The passports recorded the following information: surname, first name and patronymic, date and place of birth and ethnicity, family status, propiska, and record of military service. Sometimes the passport also had special notes, for example blood group.

As mentioned, the internal passports identified every bearer by ethnicity, e.g., Russian, Ukrainian, Uzbek, Estonian, Jew, etc. When an individual applied for a passport at age 16, they had to select the ethnicity of one of their parents.

The internal passports were written in the Russian language and the language of the republic where it was issued. The "green cover" internal passports and passports for travel abroad were written exclusively in the Russian language.

All residents were required by law to record their address on the document, and to report any changes to a local office of the Ministry of Internal Affairs (e.g., by the age of forty-five, a person has to have three photographs of himself in the passport due to the effects of aging, taken at the age of sixteen (when it is issued), twenty-five and forty-five). In Ukraine, these laws were abolished by its Constitutional Court in 2001 on the grounds of unconstitutionality. In Russia, similar cases have so far failed, and the system remains in place, although largely reduced. The system of internal passport registration remains strongly in place in Moscow, which uses the recent terrorist attacks on that city as a justification for their continued use. The Soviet Passport is also recognised as a valid ID in Transnsitria.

See also
Passport system in the Soviet Union
Eastern Bloc emigration and defection
101st kilometre
Propiska
Post-Soviet passports
Abkhazian passport
Armenian passport
Artsakh passport
Azerbaijani passport
Belarusian passport
Estonian passport
Georgian passport
Kazakhstani passport
Kyrgyzstani passport
Latvian passport
Lithuanian passport
Moldovan passport
Russian passport
South Ossetian passport
Tajik passport
Transnistrian passport
Turkmen passport
Ukrainian passport
Uzbek passport

Notes and references

External links
 V.Popov, Passport System of Soviet Serfage, "New World", Issue 6, 1996 
 Federal Migration Service of the Russian Federation -- "Historical Information" covers several centuries about passport-policy in Russia and Soviet Union -- in Russian

Soviet internal politics
Foreign relations of the Soviet Union
Soviet Union
Identity documents of the Soviet Union